Doomsday Deck is an original novel based on the U.S. television series Buffy the Vampire Slayer.

Plot summary

Joyce Summers is running a local art show for people from around the United States. A girl named Justine shows up the first day to sign in and Xander is immediately attracted to her. She offers to do a Tarot reading for him which he agrees to. Once Xander has touched her magickal deck he comes under her control and has no will of his own. Justine is building a powerful deck of Tarot cards which will allow her to control the fate of the world with the help of the goddess Kali, who, in return, wants ultimate peace on Earth. Only Justine doesn't realize what ultimate peace is and she's come to Sunnydale to collect the last four people she needs to complete her deck of cards. Once her deck has been completed the four people remaining needed for the deck will die like the other eighteen she's used to make the deck. Buffy must figure out how her friends are being controlled and find a way to fight herself out of the power of Justine's Tarot cards.

Canonical issues

Buffy novels such as this one are not usually considered by fans as canonical. Some fans consider them stories from the imaginations of authors and artists, while other fans consider them as taking place in an alternative fictional reality. However unlike fan fiction, overviews summarising their story, written early in the writing process, were 'approved' by both Fox and Joss Whedon (or his office), and the books were therefore later published as officially Buffy merchandise.

External links
The Doomsday Deck by Diamond Jim Tyler

Reviews
Litefoot1969.bravepages.com - Review of this book by Litefoot
Teen-books.com - Reviews of this book
Nika-summers.com - Review of this book by Nika Summers
Shadowcat.name - Review of this book

2000 American novels
2000 fantasy novels
Books based on Buffy the Vampire Slayer